The Michigan Shore Railroad  is a short line railroad in the United States owned by Genesee & Wyoming that operates  of track, connecting Fremont to CSX at West Olive, Michigan.

The railroad began operations in 1990, and was purchased by RailAmerica in 2000 which itself was purchased by Genesee & Wyoming in 2012.

The railroad's traffic comes mainly from sand and chemical products. They haul mainly sand and chemicals for the Webb Chemical Company in Muskegon Heights and sand for the Nugent Sand Company near Grand Haven. The MS hauled around 6,300 carloads in 2008.

Equipment

References

Michigan railroads
Switching and terminal railroads
RailAmerica